This is a list of all managers of Khazar Lankaran FK, including performance records and honours.

Khazar Lankaran had many managers and head coaches throughout their history, below is a chronological list of them from when Azerbaijan Premier League was changed into a league format.

The most successful Khazar manager in terms of trophies won is Agaselim Mirjavadov, who won Azerbaijan Premier League title, two Azerbaijan Cups and CIS Cup trophies in his 3-year reign as manager.

Statistics
Information correct as of match played 13 April 2014. Only competitive matches are counted.
(n/a) = Information not available''

Notes:
P – Total of played matches
W – Won matches
D – Drawn matches
L – Lost matches
GS – Goal scored
GA – Goals against
%W – Percentage of matches won

Nationality is indicated by the corresponding FIFA country code(s).

References

FK Khazar Lankaran managers
Khazar Lankaran
Khazar Lankaran